This is a list of formal language and literal string topics, by Wikipedia page.


Formal languages
 Abstract syntax tree
 Backus-Naur form
 Categorial grammar
 Chomsky hierarchy
 Concatenation
 Context-free grammar
 Context-sensitive grammar
 Context-sensitive language
 Decidable language
 ECLR-attributed grammar
 Finite language
 Formal grammar
 Formal language
 Formal system
 Generalized star height problem
 Kleene algebra
 Kleene star
 L-attributed grammar
 LR-attributed grammar
 Myhill-Nerode theorem
 Parsing expression grammar
 Prefix grammar
 Pumping lemma
 Recursively enumerable language
 Regular expression
 Regular grammar
 Regular language
 S-attributed grammar
 Star height
 Star height problem
 Syntactic monoid
 Syntax (logic)
 Tree-adjoining grammar

Literal strings
 Anagram
 Case sensitivity
 Infinite monkey theorem
 Lexical analysis
 Lexeme
 Lexicography
 Lexicon
 Lipogram
 The Library of Babel
 Palindrome
 Pangram
 Sequence alignment

Classical cryptography
 Atbash cipher
 Autokey cipher
 Bazeries cylinder
 Bible code
 Bifid cipher
 Caesar cipher
 Cardan grille
 Enigma machine
 Frequency analysis
 Index of coincidence
 Playfair cipher
 Polyalphabetic substitution
 Polybius square
 ROT13, ROT47
 Scytale
 Steganography
 Substitution cipher
 Tabula recta
 Transposition cipher
 Vigenère cipher

Formal languages